Cara Sucia (dirty face in Spanish) may refer to:
Cara Sucia (Mesoamerican site), an archaeological site in El Salvador
Cara sucia (TV series), a Venezuelan soap opera
Cara Sucia River, a river in El Salvador
"Casimiro Alcorta" ("Cara Sucia"), a tango song written in 1884 by Casimiro Alcorta